Atiba Allert (born 27 June 1981) is a Trinidadian cricketer. He played in nine first-class matches for Trinidad and Tobago from 2009 to 2012.

See also
 List of Trinidadian representative cricketers

References

External links
 

1981 births
Living people
Trinidad and Tobago cricketers